The 2010–11 Scottish Premier Under 19 League (also known as the Clydesdale Bank Under-19 Premier League due to sponsorship reasons) is the thirteenth season of the Scottish Premier Under-19 League, the highest youth Scottish football league. It commenced in August 2010 and will end in May 2011. The defending champions are Celtic.

League table

Results
Teams play each other twice, once at home, once away

External links
19s  2010–11 Scottish Premier Under-19 League at Scotprem

Under
SPFL Development League